Thomas Cleary (24 April 1949 – 20 June 2021) was an American translator and writer of more than 80 books related to Buddhist, Taoist, Confucian, and Muslim classics, and of The Art of War, a treatise on management, military strategy, and statecraft. He has translated books from Pali, Sanskrit, Arabic, Chinese, Japanese, and Old Irish into English. Cleary lived in Oakland, California.

Life and work
Cleary became interested in Buddhism when he was a teenager; his researches into Buddhist thought began with a desire to learn during this time of his life. When he began translating, he chose either untranslated works or—as in the case of Sun Tzu's The Art of War—books whose extant translations were "too limited". Cleary earned a Ph.D. in East Asian Languages and Civilizations from Harvard University, and a JD from the Boalt Hall School of Law at the University of California, Berkeley. After completing his doctoral studies, Cleary had little involvement with the academic world. "There is too much oppression in a university setting", he said. "I want to stay independent and reach those who want to learn directly through my books."

Cleary's brother Jonathon also completed his doctoral work in EALC at Harvard. The two brothers worked together to translate the koan collection The Blue Cliff Record; Shambhala published the translation in 1977. Thomas Cleary's most widely disseminated translation has been of Sun Tzu's The Art of War (Sunzi Bingfa). He also translated, beginning in 1984, the monumental Avatamsaka Sutra (also called Huayan Jing, or the Flower Ornament Scripture). The one volume edition was published in 1993. Another major translation was of the commentaries of the 18th century Taoist sage Liu Yiming, who explains the metaphoric coding of the main Taoist texts dealing with the transformation of consciousness, and the fusion of the human mind with the mind of Tao.

In 2000, Cleary's various translations of Taoist texts were collected into four volumes by Shambhala Publications as The Taoist Classics. Following the success of these publications, a five-volume collection of Buddhist translations was collected as Classics of Buddhism and Zen. Another translation from the Muslim wisdom tradition is Living and Dying with Grace. In 1993 Cleary published a translation of Miyamoto Musashi's Book of Five Rings.

Cleary died on 20 June 2021 in Oakland, California, due to complications from previous illnesses. He is survived by his wife and brothers.

References

1949 births
2021 deaths
Buddhist translators
Chinese–English translators
Japanese–English translators
Harvard Graduate School of Arts and Sciences alumni
Translators of the Quran into English
UC Berkeley School of Law alumni